César Soto Esquivel (born September 17, 1971) is a Mexican retired professional boxer and is a former WBC featherweight champion.

Professional career
Soto got his first world title shot in September 1991 against WBO bantamweight title holder Duke McKenzie in London, losing a unanimous decision.

In July 1993, César knocked out future lightweight champion, José Luis Castillo in two one-sided rounds, becoming the first man to defeat him.

Soto's second title shot was against WBC featherweight title holder Luisito Espinosa in July 1996, which was another unanimous decision loss for Soto.

In May 1999, Soto got another title shot against Espinosa at the Equestrian Center, El Paso, Texas, this time winning a controversial unanimous decision.

Soto lost the WBC title in his first defense in a unification bout with Lineal/WBO champion Naseem Hamed via a unanimous decision at the Joe Louis Arena, Detroit, Michigan in October 1999.

Soto continued his career despite losing more than he won, until finally retiring in 2011 with a record of 63-24-3 with 43 KOs.

See also

List of Mexican boxing world champions
List of WBC world champions
List of featherweight boxing champions

References

External links

Boxers from Durango
World Boxing Council champions
World featherweight boxing champions
World boxing champions
Featherweight boxers
1971 births
Living people
Mexican male boxers